Janet Robertson (born 1965 in Río Gallegos, Santa Cruz Province) is an Argentine-born Falkland Islands politician who served as a Member of the Legislative Assembly for the Stanley constituency from 2005 until 2009. Robertson was elected as a Member of the Legislative Council, which was reconstituted into the Legislative Assembly with the implementation of the 2009 Constitution.

Robertson was born in Argentina to Falkland Islander parents in 1965. Her mother, Ana Chiswell (British descent), was born in Buenos Aires and her father was born in the Falklands and had a sheep farm near Río Gallegos. Robertson has a brother, Pablo, born in Río Gallegos and, now, is a pilot of FIGAS.

Her family moved to Port Stephens in the Falklands when she was four, but in 1975 she returned to Argentina where she was educated in Cordoba Province with her brother. She went on to study in Wales at Atlantic College, before gaining a degree in International Relations from the University of Sussex.

She was elected to the Legislative Council at the 2005 general election, but lost her seat four years later in the 2009 general election.

References

1965 births
Living people
People from Río Gallegos, Santa Cruz
Alumni of the University of Sussex
Falkland Islands Councillors 2005–2009
People educated at Atlantic College
Argentine people of Falkland Islands descent
Argentine emigrants to the Falkland Islands
Falkland Islands women in politics
21st-century British women politicians